Patan is a city in the Indian state of Rajasthan. In the 12th century, it became the centre of a minor state called Tanwarawati or Torawati, ruled by a Tomar family.

Battle of Patan

In the eighteenth century the great Maratha warrior Alijah Shrinath Mahdhojirao (alias Mahadji Shinde) won the battle against the Rajput armies of Jaipur. Today's Jaipur and Jodhpur were on one side and on the other side was the  army of Shrinath Mahadji Shinde  supported by  De Boigne. of 19 June 1790 between the Marathas with French troops and the Rao Rajputs of Jaipur and Jodhpur.  For details of the battle and the role of De Boigne see Jadunath Sarkar.

See also
Ganga Sahai

References

Cities and towns in Sikar district